The Embassy of Bosnia and Herzegovina in London is the diplomatic mission of Bosnia and Herzegovina in the United Kingdom.

Gallery

References

External links
Official site

Bosnia and Herzegovina
Diplomatic missions of Bosnia and Herzegovina
Bosnia and Herzegovina–United Kingdom relations
Buildings and structures in the Royal Borough of Kensington and Chelsea
South Kensington